Cătălin Voicu (born 21 March 1965) is a Romanian politician, member of the Social Democratic Party, and member of Parliament of Romania in 2004–2008 and 2008–2012 legislature. Voicu was adviser of the President of Romania, Ion Iliescu, from 2000 until 2004.

Controversies
On 10 December 2009, Raphael Voicu was invited for questioning by the National Anticorruption Directorate. He was later arrested and investigated for corruption and trafficking in influence. The main accusations were based on phone calls between him and various other individuals. After almost 16 months of preventive detention, on 19 July 2010, he was released from jail. In June 2012 he was sentenced to five years in traffic of influence case
. The prosecutors considered that he had built up "a criminal network based on bribery, intimidation and extortion". On 22 April 2013 he was convicted to 7 years in prison.

See also 
 List of corruption scandals in Romania

References

External links
 Senator Catalin Voicu Sentenced To Five Years In Prison For Corruption
 Catalin Voicu released form custody: “I’m completely innocent!”
 Anticorruption prosecutors ask for Senator Catalin Voicu to be re-arrested
 Corruption - Catalin Voicu bientôt arrêté?
 Rumänien: Machtkampf und Schlammschlacht unter korrupten Politikern

Living people
1965 births
Politicians from Bucharest
Social Democratic Party (Romania) politicians
Members of the Chamber of Deputies (Romania)
Members of the Senate of Romania
Romanian politicians convicted of corruption